Broken Record is the debut extended play (EP) by American singer-songwriter Jayme Dee. It was released in the United States on July 30, 2013 by Republic Records. Throughout the recording process, Dee worked with a variety of producers such as Aaron Michael Cox, Fraser T Smith, and The Matrix.

The EP was preceded by the single "Tip Toes", which was released on August 21, 2012.

Singles
Broken Record was preceded by the single "Tip Toes", which was released on August 21, 2012, after Dee released a snippet of the song a month prior.

Track listing

Personnel
Credits and personnel for Broken Record adapted from AllMusic.

 Ernest Clark – production 
 Aaron Michael Cox – production 
 Jayme Dee – vocals, production 
 Fraser T. Smith – production 
 David Hodges – production 
 The Matrix – production 
 Steve Miller – production 
 Marcos Palacios – production 
 Adam Stidham – production

Release history

References

2013 debut EPs
Albums produced by Fraser T. Smith
Albums produced by the Matrix (production team)
Pop albums by American artists
Republic Records EPs